iOS is a mobile operating system developed by Apple Inc. It was first released as iPhone OS in June 2007. iPhone OS was renamed iOS following the release of the iPad, starting with iOS 4. With iOS 13, Apple began offering a separate operating system, iPadOS, for the iPad. iOS is also the foundation of the newer audioOS and tvOS, and shares some of its code with macOS. New iOS versions are released every year alongside new iPhone models. From its launch in 2007 until 2010, this occurred in June or July, since then, new major versions are released in September or October.

Overview

Releases

iPhone OS 1 

Apple announced iPhone OS 1 at the iPhone keynote on January 9, 2007, and it was released to the public alongside the original iPhone on June 29, 2007. No official name was given when the iPhone was released; Apple marketing literature simply stated the iPhone ran a mobile version of "OS X".  During the development phase of iPhone OS 1, there were at least 17-18 different concepts developed. Many on the team were still hung up on the idea that everyone would want to type on a hardware keyboard, not a glass screen. The idea of introducing a complete touch screen was very novel to everyone. Many user interfaces were prototyped, including the multi-touch click-wheel. Although many thought it was a waste of time, Apple CEO Steve Jobs insisted on prototyping all concepts before the Mac OS-X-based version of the operating system was selected. The release of iPhone OS 1.1 brought support for the iPod Touch (1st generation). iPhone OS 1.1.4 is the final version of iPhone OS 1 for the iPhone, and iPhone OS 1.1.5 is the final version of iPhone OS 1 for the iPod Touch (1st generation). It was succeeded by iPhone OS 2 on July 11, 2008. It became unsupported on May 18, 2010.

iPhone OS 2 

Apple announced iPhone OS 2 at the 2008 Worldwide Developers Conference (WWDC) on June 9, and it was released to the public on July 11, 2008, alongside the iPhone 3G. iPhone OS 2 was the first release to have the App Store, allowing developers to create official third-party apps for the iPhone; previously, people had to download a jailbreak to do this. This OS was made available to iPod Touch users for a fee of $9.95.  this upgrade introduced key requested features such as a push email. Apple did not drop support for any of its devices with the release; iPhone OS 2 was compatible with all devices released up to that time. The release of iPhone OS 2.1.1 brought support for the iPod Touch (2nd generation). iPhone OS 2.2.1 is the final version of iPhone OS 2. It was succeeded by iPhone OS 3 on August 11, 2009.

iPhone OS 3 

Apple announced iPhone OS 3 on March 17, 2009, and it was released to the public on June 17, 2009, alongside the iPhone 3GS. Apple did not drop support for any devices with this release. iPhone OS 3 was compatible with all devices released up to that time, but not all features were available on the original iPhone. The final release supported on the original iPhone and iPod Touch (1st generation) is iPhone OS 3.1.3. The first iPad was introduced along with iPhone OS 3.2. iPhone OS 3 was succeeded by iOS 4 on June 21, 2010.

iOS 4 

Apple announced iOS 4 in March 2010 and it was released to the public on June 21, 2010, alongside the iPhone 4. It was the first version of the operating system to be called "iOS", due to the iPad being released. With this release, Apple dropped support for the original iPhone and the 1st gen iPod Touch, which is the first time Apple had dropped support for any device in a iOS release. The iPhone 3G and the 2nd generation iPod Touch were capable of running iOS 4, but had more limited features. For example, both devices lacked multitasking, and the ability to set a custom home screen wallpaper. This was also the first major release to be free of charge for iPod Touch users. The release of iOS 4.2.1 brought compatibility to the original iPad and was the final release supported on the iPhone 3G and 2nd generation iPod Touch due to huge performance issues. The release of iOS 4.3 added support for the iPad 2. It was succeeded by iOS 5 on October 12, 2011.

iOS 5 

Apple announced iOS 5 on June 6, 2011, at its annual Apple Worldwide Developers Conference (WWDC) event, and it was released to the public on October 12, 2011, alongside the iPhone 4S. With this release, Apple dropped support for the iPhone 3G and the iPod Touch (2nd generation) due to hardware limitations. The release of iOS 5.1 brought support for the iPad (3rd generation). iOS 5.1.1 was the final release supported for the iPad (1st generation) and iPod Touch (3rd generation). It was also the last iOS version released while Steve Jobs was alive. It was succeeded by iOS 6 on September 19, 2012.

iOS 6 

Apple announced iOS 6 on June 11, 2012, at its annual Apple Worldwide Developers Conference (WWDC) event, and it was released to the public on September 19, 2012, alongside the iPhone 5, iPod Touch (5th generation), and iPad (4th generation). With this release, Apple dropped support for the iPod Touch (3rd generation) and the iPad (1st generation) due to performance issues, and offered only limited support on the iPhone 3GS and iPod Touch (4th generation) due to the discontinuation of MobileMe. The iPhone 4 onwards, the iPod Touch (5th generation), the iPad 2 onwards and the iPad Mini (1st generation) were fully supported. iOS 6.1.6 was the final release supported for the iPhone 3GS and iPod Touch (4th generation). It was succeeded by iOS 7 on September 18, 2013.

iOS 7 

Apple announced iOS 7 on June 10, 2013, at its annual Apple Worldwide Developers Conference (WWDC) event, and it was released to the public on September 18, 2013, alongside the iPhone 5C and iPhone 5S. With this release, Apple dropped support for the iPhone 3GS due to hardware limitations and the iPod Touch (4th generation) due to performance issues. iOS 7 has limited support on the iPad 2 and the iPhone 4 since they do not support Siri. However, other devices from the iPhone 4S onwards, iPod Touch (5th generation) onwards, the iPad (3rd generation) onwards, and the iPad Mini (1st generation) onwards were fully supported. The release of iOS 7.0.3 brought support for the iPad Air and iPad Mini 2. iOS 7.1.2 was the final release on the iPhone 4. iOS 7 is the first iOS version to support 64-bit processors. It is also the first iOS version to run 64-bit apps. It was succeeded by iOS 8 on June 2, 2014.

iOS 8 

Apple announced iOS 8 on June 2, 2014, at its annual Apple Worldwide Developers Conference (WWDC) event, and it was released to the public on September 17, 2014, alongside the iPhone 6 and iPhone 6 Plus. With this release, Apple dropped support for the iPhone 4 due to performance issues, and the Apple TV (2nd generation) due to hardware limitations. iOS 8 has limited support on the iPad 2, iPhone 4S, iPad (3rd generation), iPad Mini (1st generation), and the iPod Touch (5th generation), as Apple received widespread complaints of extremely poor performance from owners of these devices. All other devices from the iPhone 5 onwards, iPod Touch (6th generation) onwards, the iPad (4th generation) onwards, and the iPad Mini 2 onwards were fully supported. The release of iOS 8.1 brought support for the iPad Air 2 and iPad Mini 3, and the release of iOS 8.4 brought support for the iPod Touch (6th generation). iOS 8.3 was the first version of iOS to have public beta testing available, where users could test the beta for upcoming releases of iOS and send feedback to Apple about bugs and issues. The final version of iOS 8 was iOS 8.4.1. iOS 8 was succeeded by iOS 9 on June 8, 2015.

iOS 9 

Apple announced iOS 9 on June 8, 2015, at its annual Apple Worldwide Developers Conference (WWDC) event, and it was released to the public on September 16, 2015, alongside the iPhone 6S, iPhone 6S Plus and iPad Mini 4. With this release, Apple did not drop support for any iOS devices, but support for Apple TV (3rd generation) has been dropped following the release due to 32-bit deprecations. Therefore, iOS 9 was supported on the iPhone 4S onwards, iPod Touch (5th generation) onwards, the iPad 2 onwards, and the iPad Mini (1st generation) onwards. However, iOS 9 has limited support on devices with an Apple A5 or A5X processor: the iPhone 4S, iPad 2, iPad (3rd generation), iPad Mini (1st generation), and iPod Touch (5th generation). This release made the iPad 2 the first device to support six major releases of iOS, supporting iOS 4 through iOS 9. Despite Apple's promise of better performance on these devices, there were still widespread complaints that the issue had not been fixed. iOS 9.3.5 is the final release on the iPod Touch (5th generation), the Wi-Fi-only iPad 2, the Wi-Fi-only iPad (3rd generation), and the Wi-Fi-only iPad Mini (1st generation). iOS 9.3.6 is the final release on the iPhone 4S, the Wi-Fi + cellular iPad 2, the Wi-Fi + cellular iPad (3rd generation), and the Wi-Fi + cellular iPad Mini (1st generation). iOS 9 was succeeded by iOS 10 on September 10, 2016.

iOS 10 

Apple announced iOS 10 on June 13, 2016, at its annual Apple Worldwide Developers Conference (WWDC) event, and it was released to the public on September 13, 2016, alongside the iPhone 7 and iPhone 7 Plus. With this release, Apple dropped support for devices using an A5 or A5X processor: the iPhone 4S, the iPad 2, iPad (3rd generation), iPad Mini (1st generation), and iPod Touch (5th generation) due to hardware limitations and performance issues, ending software support for iPhones and iPads with 30-pin connector and 3.5-inch display. iOS 10 has limited support on devices with 32-bit processors: the iPhone 5, iPhone 5C, and iPad (4th generation). However, the iPhone 5S onwards, iPod Touch (6th generation), iPad Air onwards, and the iPad Mini 2 onwards are fully supported. The release of iOS 10.2.1 brought support for the iPad (5th generation), and iOS 10.3.2 brought support for the iPad Pro (10.5-inch) and the iPad Pro (12.9-inch, 2nd generation). iOS 10.3.3 is the final supported release for the iPhone 5C and the Wi-Fi-only iPad (4th generation). iOS 10.3.4 is the final supported release for the iPhone 5 and the Wi-Fi + cellular iPad (4th generation). iOS 10 is the final iOS version to run on 32-bit processors. It is also the final version of iOS to run 32-bit apps. It was succeeded by iOS 11 on September 19, 2017.

iOS 11 

Apple announced iOS 11 on June 5, 2017, at its annual Apple Worldwide Developers Conference (WWDC) event, and it was released to the public on September 19, 2017, alongside the iPhone 8 and iPhone 8 Plus. With this release, Apple dropped support for the 32-bit iPhone 5, iPhone 5C, and iPad (4th generation) and also for 32-bit applications. iOS 11 has limited support on devices with the Apple A7 or A8 processors: the iPhone 5S, iPhone 6/6 Plus, iPod Touch (6th generation), iPad Air, iPad Air 2, iPad Mini 2, 3, and 4. However, all other devices from the iPhone 6S/6S Plus onwards, iPhone SE (1st generation), iPad Pro, and iPad (5th generation) onwards are fully supported. iOS 11.0.1 brought support for the iPhone X and iOS 11.3 brought support for the iPad (6th generation). The final version of iOS 11 to be released was iOS 11.4.1. iOS 11 is the first version of iOS to only run on 64-bit processors. It is also the first iOS version to run only 64-bit apps; 32-bit apps are not supported on iOS 11 or later. It was succeeded by iOS 12 on September 17, 2018.

iOS 12 

Apple announced iOS 12 on June 4, 2018, at its annual Apple Worldwide Developers Conference (WWDC) event, and it was released to the public on September 17, 2018, alongside the iPhone XS, iPhone XS Max and iPhone XR. With this release, Apple did not drop support for any iOS devices. Therefore, iOS 12 was supported on the iPhone 5S onwards, iPod Touch (6th generation), the iPad Air onwards and the iPad Mini 2 onwards. However, iOS 12 has limited support on devices with the Apple A7 or A8 processors: the iPhone 5S, iPhone 6/6 Plus, iPod Touch (6th generation), iPad Air, iPad Air 2, iPad Mini 2, 3 and 4. All other devices from the iPhone 6S/6S Plus onwards, the iPad Air (2019), the iPad (5th generation) onwards and all iPad Pro models are fully supported. iOS 12.1 brought support to the iPad Pro (12.9-inch, 3rd generation) and iPad Pro (11-inch, 1st generation) and iOS 12.2 brought support to the iPad Mini (5th generation) and iPad Air (3rd generation). iOS 12.5.7 is the last supported release for the iPhone 5S, iPhone 6, iPhone 6 Plus, iPad Air (1st generation), iPad mini 2, iPad mini 3, and iPod touch (6th generation). It was the last iOS version to run on iPads; it was succeeded by iOS 13 on iPhones and iPadOS 13 on iPads on September 19, 2019.

iOS 13 

Apple announced iOS 13 on June 3, 2019, at its annual Apple Worldwide Developers Conference (WWDC) event, and it was released to the public on September 19, 2019, alongside the iPhone 11 series (11, 11 Pro, 11 Pro Max). The principal features include an option for dark mode and Memoji support for A9+ devices. The NFC framework now supports reading several types of contactless smartcards and tags. The iPad gains several tablet-oriented features, and its operating system has been rebranded as iPadOS; iPadOS 13 was announced at the 2019 WWDC as well. With this release, Apple dropped support for all devices with less than 2 GB of RAM, which included the iPhone 5S and iPhone 6/6 Plus, iPod Touch (6th generation), iPad Mini 2, iPad Mini 3, and iPad Air. iOS 13/iPadOS 13 has limited support on devices with the A8/A8X (the iPad Air 2 and iPad Mini 4). However, all other devices from the iPhone 6S/6S Plus onwards, iPod Touch (7th generation), iPad Pro (1st generation), iPad (5th generation), and iPad Mini (5th generation) onwards are fully supported (A9 and A10 devices having almost full support, A11 and later having full support). iOS 13 brought support for the iPhone 11 and iPhone 11 Pro / Pro Max, second-generation iPhone SE, and iPadOS 13 brought support for the iPad (7th generation), the iPad Pro (12.9-inch, 4th generation) and the iPad Pro (11-inch, 2nd generation). It was succeeded by iOS 14 and iPadOS 14 on September 16, 2020.

iOS 14 

Apple announced iOS 14 and iPadOS 14 on June 22, 2020, at its annual WWDC 2020 event, with a developer beta released on the same day and a public beta released on July 9, 2020. iOS 14 and iPadOS 14 were released on September 16, 2020, alongside the iPad (8th Generation) and iPad Air (4th Generation). All devices that supported iOS 13 also support iOS 14. This makes the iPad Air 2 the first device to support seven versions of iOS and iPadOS, from iOS 8 to iPadOS 14. Some new features introduced in iOS 14 and iPadOS 14 include redesigned widgets that can now be placed directly on the homescreen (only for iOS), along with the App Library, which automatically categorizes apps into one page, Picture in Picture in iPhone and iPod Touch, and the CarKey technology to unlock and start a car with NFC. iOS and iPadOS 14 also allow the user to have incoming calls shown in banners rather than taking up the whole screen (the latter view is still available as an optional function). It was succeeded by iOS 15 and iPadOS 15 on September 20, 2021.

The release of iPadOS 14.0 brought support for the 8th generation iPad and the 4th generation iPad Air and the release of iOS 14.1 brought support for the iPhone 12, the iPhone 12 Mini and the iPhone 12 Pro and Pro Max. iOS 14 and iPadOS 14 have limited support on devices with A8, A8X, A9, A9X and A10 Fusion chips, whereas devices with A10X Fusion and A11 Bionic chip have almost full support, and devices with A12 Bionic chip and later have full support.

iOS 15 

Apple announced iOS 15 and iPadOS 15 on June 7, 2021, at its annual WWDC 2021 event, with a developer beta released on the same day and a public beta released a few weeks later, at the end of June 2021. All devices that supported iOS 13, iPadOS 13, iOS 14, and iPadOS 14 also support iOS 15 and iPadOS 15. This makes the iPad Air 2 the first device to support eight versions of iOS and iPadOS, from iOS 8 to iPadOS 15. However, iOS 15 and iPadOS 15 have limited support on devices with A8, A8X, A9, A9X, A10 Fusion, A10X Fusion and A11 Bionic chips, which include iPhone 6S, iPhone 7, iPhone 8, iPhone X, iPhone SE (1st generation), iPod Touch (7th generation), iPad (5th generation), iPad (6th generation), iPad (7th generation), iPad Air 2, iPad Mini 4, iPad Pro (1st generation) and iPad Pro (2nd generation). The release of iOS 15.4 brought support for the iPhone SE 3rd generation, while the release of iPadOS 15.4 brought support for the new iPad Air 5th generation. iOS 15 is the final version of iOS to work on the iPod Touch line, as the final model, the 7th generation was discontinued 4 months earlier, with no successor. iOS 15 was succeeded by iOS 16 and iPadOS 16 on September 12, 2022.

iOS 16 

Apple announced iOS 16 and iPadOS 16 on June 6, 2022, at its annual WWDC 2022 event, with a developer beta released on the same day. With the release, Apple dropped support for iPhone and iPod Touch models with A9 and A10 Fusion chips (the iPhone 6S/6S Plus, the 1st gen iPhone SE, the iPhone 7/7 Plus and the 7th gen iPod Touch) due to hardware limitations and Chinese government's border stringent in response of COVID-19 pandemic and dropped support for iPad models with A8 and A8X chips (the iPad Air 2 and iPad Mini 4) due to hardware limitations and 2020-present global chip shortage, ending support for iPhones without Neural Engine, without wireless charging, with 3.5mm headphone jack, 4-inch display and the iPod Touch product line as a whole. iOS 16 has limited support on iPhone models with A11 Bionic chips, such as iPhone 8/8 Plus and iPhone X, while iPadOS 16 has limited support on iPad models with A9, A9X, A10 Fusion and A10X Fusion chips, such as the 5th gen iPad, the 6th gen iPad, the 7th gen iPad, the 1st gen iPad Pro and the 2nd gen iPad Pro. However, devices with A12 Bionic and A12X Bionic chips or newer, such as iPhone XS/XS Max and onwards, iPhone XR and onwards, the 2nd gen iPhone SE and onwards, the 8th gen iPad and onwards, the 5th gen iPad Mini and onwards, the 3rd gen iPad Air and onwards and the 3rd gen iPad Pro and onwards, are fully supported (A12 and A13 models having almost full support, A14 and later have full support). iOS 16 is the first version of iOS since 2007 to be supported only on iPhone due to the discontinuation of the iPod Touch.

Device codes

iPhone 

 iPhone (1st generation)
 iPhone 3G
 iPhone 3GS
 iPhone 4 (GSM version)
 iPhone 4 (CDMA version)
 iPhone 4S
 iPhone 5
 iPhone 5C
 iPhone 5S
 iPhone 6
 iPhone 6 Plus
 iPhone 6S
 iPhone 6S Plus
 iPhone SE (1st generation)
 iPhone 7 with Intel PMB9943 modem
 iPhone 7 with Qualcomm MDM9645 modem
 iPhone 7 Plus with Intel PMB9943 modem
 iPhone 7 Plus with Qualcomm MDM9645 modem
 iPhone 8 with Intel PMB9948 modem
 iPhone 8 with Qualcomm MDM9655 modem
 iPhone 8 Plus with Intel PMB9948 modem
 iPhone 8 Plus with Qualcomm MDM9655 modem
 iPhone X with Intel PMB9948 modem
 iPhone X with Qualcomm MDM9655 modem
 iPhone XS
 iPhone XS Max
 iPhone XR
 iPhone 11
 iPhone 11 Pro
 iPhone 11 Pro Max
 iPhone SE (2nd generation)
 iPhone 12
 iPhone 12 Mini
 iPhone 12 Pro
 iPhone 12 Pro Max
 iPhone 13
 iPhone 13 Mini
 iPhone 13 Pro
 iPhone 13 Pro Max
 iPhone 14
 iPhone 14 Plus
 iPhone 14 Pro
 iPhone 14 Pro Max
 iPhone SE (3rd generation)

iPod Touch 

 iPod Touch (1st generation)
 iPod Touch (2nd generation)
 iPod Touch (3rd generation)
 iPod Touch (4th generation)
 iPod Touch (5th generation)
 iPod Touch (6th generation)
 iPod Touch (7th generation)

iPad & iPad Air 

 iPad (1st generation) Wi-Fi only
 iPad (1st generation) Wi-Fi+3G
 iPad 2 Wi-Fi-only
 iPad 2 Wi-Fi+3G GSM
 iPad 2 Wi-Fi+3G CDMA
 iPad (3rd generation) Wi-Fi-only
 iPad (3rd generation) Wi-Fi+4G (LTE) (AT&T/global version)
 iPad (3rd generation) Wi-Fi+4G (LTE) (Verizon version)
 iPad (4th generation) Wi-Fi-only
 iPad (4th generation) Wi-Fi+4G (LTE) (AT&T/global version)
 iPad (4th generation) Wi-Fi+4G (LTE) (Verizon version)
 iPad Air Wi-Fi-only
 iPad Air Wi-Fi+4G (LTE) (AT&T/global version)
 iPad Air Wi-Fi+4G (LTE) (Verizon version)
 iPad Air 2 Wi-Fi-only
 iPad Air 2 Wi-Fi+4G (LTE) (AT&T/global version)
 iPad (5th generation) Wi-Fi-only
 iPad (5th generation) Wi-Fi+4G (LTE) (AT&T/global version)
 iPad (6th generation) Wi-Fi-only
 iPad (6th generation) Wi-Fi+4G (LTE) (AT&T/global version)
 iPad Air (3rd generation) Wi-Fi-only
 iPad Air (3rd generation) Wi-Fi+4G (LTE) (AT&T/global version)
 iPad (7th generation) Wi-Fi-only
 iPad (7th generation) Wi-Fi+4G (LTE) (AT&T/global version)
 iPad Air (4th generation) Wi-Fi-only
 iPad Air (4th generation) Wi-Fi+4G (LTE) (AT&T/global version)
 iPad (8th generation) Wi-Fi-only
 iPad (8th generation) Wi-Fi+4G (LTE) (AT&T/global version)
 iPad (9th generation) Wi-Fi-only
 iPad (9th generation) Wi-Fi+4G (LTE) (AT&T/global version)
 iPad Air (5th generation) Wi-Fi-only
 iPad Air (5th generation) Wi-Fi+5G (AT&T/global version)
 iPad (10th generation) Wi-Fi-only
 iPad (10th generation) Wi-Fi+4G (LTE) (AT&T/global version)

iPad Mini 

 iPad Mini (1st generation) Wi-Fi-only
 iPad Mini (1st generation) Wi-Fi+4G (LTE)
 iPad Mini 2 Wi-Fi-only
 iPad Mini 2 Wi-Fi+4G (LTE)
 iPad Mini 3 Wi-Fi-only
 iPad Mini 3 Wi-Fi+4G (LTE)
 iPad Mini 4 Wi-Fi-only
 iPad Mini 4 Wi-Fi+4G (LTE)
 iPad Mini (5th generation) Wi-Fi-only
 iPad Mini (5th generation) Wi-Fi+4G (LTE)
 iPad Mini (6th generation) Wi-Fi-only
 iPad Mini (6th generation) Wi-Fi+5G

iPad Pro 

 iPad Pro (1st generation) (12.9-inch) Wi-Fi-only
 iPad Pro (1st generation) (12.9-inch) Wi-Fi+4G (LTE)
 iPad Pro (9.7-inch) Wi-Fi-only
 iPad Pro (9.7-inch) Wi-Fi+4G (LTE)
 iPad Pro (2nd generation) (12.9-inch) Wi-Fi-only
 iPad Pro (2nd generation) (12.9-inch) Wi-Fi+4G (LTE)
 iPad Pro (10.5-inch) Wi-Fi-only
 iPad Pro (10.5-inch) Wi-Fi+4G (LTE)
 iPad Pro (3rd generation) (12.9-inch) Wi-Fi-only
 iPad Pro (3rd generation) (12.9-inch) Wi-Fi+4G (LTE)
 iPad Pro (1st generation) (11-inch) Wi-Fi-only
 iPad Pro (1st generation) (11-inch) Wi-Fi+4G (LTE)
 iPad Pro (4th generation) (12.9-inch) Wi-Fi-only
 iPad Pro (4th generation) (12.9-inch) Wi-Fi+4G (LTE)
 iPad Pro (2nd generation) (11-inch) Wi-Fi-only
 iPad Pro (2nd generation) (11-inch) Wi-Fi+4G (LTE)
 iPad Pro (5th generation) (12.9-inch) Wi-Fi-only
 iPad Pro (5th generation) (12.9-inch) Wi-Fi+5G
 iPad Pro (3rd generation) (11-inch) Wi-Fi-only
 iPad Pro (3rd generation) (11-inch) Wi-Fi+5G
 iPad Pro (6th generation) (12.9-inch) Wi-Fi-only
 iPad Pro (6th generation) (12.9-inch) Wi-Fi+5G
 iPad Pro (4th generation) (11-inch) Wi-Fi-only
 iPad Pro (4th generation) (11-inch) Wi-Fi+5G

Hardware support

See also 

 Information on other operating systems developed by Apple Inc.
 iPadOS
 macOS
 watchOS
 tvOS
 Notable software bugs and issues in iOS
 Issues relating to iOS

 Version histories for other operating systems and products by Apple Inc.
 iPadOS version history
 macOS version history
 iTunes version history
 Safari version history
 Version histories for other mobile operating systems
 Android version history

References

External links 
  – official site
  – official site

Lists of operating systems
Software version histories
Tablet operating systems